Thomas Bolling Robertson (February 27, 1779 – October 5, 1828) was an Attorney General of the Orleans Territory, Secretary of the Louisiana Territory, a United States representative from Louisiana, the 3rd Governor of Louisiana, Attorney General of Louisiana and a United States district judge of the United States District Court for the Eastern District of Louisiana and the United States District Court for the Western District of Louisiana.

Education and career

Born on February 27, 1779, born at Belleield in Petersburg, Virginia, Robertson attended the College of William & Mary and read law in 1806. He was admitted to the bar and entered private practice in Petersburg in 1806. He was Attorney General of the Orleans Territory from 1806 to 1807. He was Secretary of the Louisiana Territory from 1807 to 1811.

Congressional service

Upon the admission of the Territory into the Union as the State of Louisiana, Robertson was elected as a Democratic-Republican from Louisiana's at-large congressional district to the United States House of Representatives of the 12th United States Congress and to the three succeeding Congresses and served from April 30, 1812, to April 20, 1818, when he resigned. He was chairman of the Committee on Public Lands for the 14th and 15th United States Congresses.

Later career

Following his departure from Congress, Robertson resumed private practice in Louisiana from 1818 to 1820. He was the 3rd Governor of Louisiana from December 18, 1820, until his resignation on November 15, 1822. He was Attorney General of Louisiana in 1822.

Federal judicial service

Robertson was nominated by President James Monroe on May 24, 1824, to a joint seat on the United States District Court for the Eastern District of Louisiana and the United States District Court for the Western District of Louisiana vacated by Judge John Dick. He was confirmed by the United States Senate on May 26, 1824, and received his commission the same day. His service terminated on October 5, 1828, due to his death in White Sulphur Springs, Virginia (now West Virginia). He was interred in Copeland Hill Cemetery in White Sulphur Springs.

Membership

Robertson was elected a member of the American Antiquarian Society in 1821.

Agricultural society

In 1827, Robertson, along with Armand Duplantier, Fulwar Skipwith, Antoine Blanc and  Sebastien Hiriart received permission from the Louisiana State Legislature to organize a corporation called the Agricultural Society of Baton Rouge.

Family

Robertson had two brothers with political legacies:  United States Representative John Robertson and Wyndham Robertson, a Governor of Virginia. He married Lelia Skipwith, daughter of Fulwar Skipwith

Honor

Robertson Street in New Orleans is named for the former Governor.

References

Sources

External links

 State of Louisiana - Biography
 
 Cemetery Memorial by La-Cemeteries

1779 births
1828 deaths
Judges of the United States District Court for the District of Louisiana
Judges of the United States District Court for the Western District of Louisiana
Judges of the United States District Court for the Eastern District of Louisiana
United States federal judges appointed by James Monroe
19th-century American judges
Governors of Louisiana
College of William & Mary alumni
Louisiana Attorneys General
Democratic-Republican Party members of the United States House of Representatives from Louisiana
Democratic-Republican Party state governors of the United States
Members of the American Antiquarian Society
United States federal judges admitted to the practice of law by reading law
Robertson family of Virginia
Burials in West Virginia